The 2018 Copa Sudamericana first stage was played from 13 February to 23 May 2018. A total of 44 teams competed in the first stage to decide 22 of the 32 places in the second stage of the 2018 Copa Sudamericana.

Draw

The draw for the first stage was held on 20 December 2017, 20:00 PYST (UTC−3), at the CONMEBOL Convention Centre in Luque, Paraguay. For the first stage, the teams were divided into two pots according to their geographical zones:
Pot A (South Zone): 22 teams from Argentina, Bolivia, Chile, Paraguay, and Uruguay
Pot B (North Zone): 22 teams from Brazil, Colombia, Ecuador, Peru, and Venezuela

The 44 teams were drawn into 22 ties (E1–E22) between a team from Pot A and a team from Pot B, with the teams from Pot B hosting the second leg in odd-numbered ties, and the teams from Pot A hosting the second leg in even-numbered ties. This distribution ensured that teams from the same association could not be drawn into the same tie.

Notes

Format

In the first stage, each tie was played on a home-and-away two-legged basis. If tied on aggregate, the away goals rule would be used. If still tied, extra time would not be played, and the penalty shoot-out would be used to determine the winner (Regulations Article 27).

The 22 winners of the first stage advanced to the second stage to join the 10 teams transferred from the Copa Libertadores (two best teams eliminated in the third stage of qualifying and eight third-placed teams in the group stage).

Matches
The first legs were played on 13, 15, 20–22 February, 10–12 and 18 April, and the second legs were played on 6–8 March, 8–10 and 23 May 2018.

|}

Match E1

Tied 2–2 on aggregate, Caracas won on away goals and advanced to the second stage.

Match E2

Deportes Temuco won 3–1 on aggregate and advanced to the second stage.

Match E3

Lanús won 5–4 on aggregate and advanced to the second stage.

Match E4

Deportivo Cali won 5–3 on aggregate and advanced to the second stage.

Match E5

San Lorenzo won 1–0 on aggregate and advanced to the second stage.

Match E6

Tied 4–4 on aggregate, LDU Quito won on away goals and advanced to the second stage.

Match E7

Tied 0–0 on aggregate, Nacional won on penalties and advanced to the second stage.

Match E8

Cerro won 2–0 on aggregate and advanced to the second stage.

Match E9

Tied 3–3 on aggregate, Sol de América won on away goals and advanced to the second stage.

Match E10

General Díaz won 2–1 on aggregate and advanced to the second stage.

Match E11

Tied 2–2 on aggregate, Deportivo Cuenca won on penalties and advanced to the second stage.

Match E12

Rampla Juniors won 4–2 on aggregate and advanced to the second stage.

Match E13

Defensa y Justicia won 3–1 on aggregate and advanced to the second stage.

Match E14

Atlético Paranaense won 4–2 on aggregate and advanced to the second stage.

Match E15

Sport Huancayo won 3–0 on aggregate and advanced to the second stage.

Match E16

Boston River won 4–2 on aggregate and advanced to the second stage.

Match E17

São Paulo won 1–0 on aggregate and advanced to the second stage.

Match E18

El Nacional won 4–3 on aggregate and advanced to the second stage.

Match E19

Bahia won 4–1 on aggregate and advanced to the second stage.

Match E20

Colón won 3–0 on aggregate and advanced to the second stage.

Match E21

Botafogo won 3–2 on aggregate and advanced to the second stage.

Match E22

Fluminense won 3–2 on aggregate and advanced to the second stage.

Notes

References

External links
CONMEBOL Sudamericana 2018, CONMEBOL.com

1
February 2018 sports events in South America
March 2018 sports events in South America
April 2018 sports events in South America
May 2018 sports events in South America